Najmabad (also Romanized as Najmābād) is a village in Qarah Bagh Rural District, in the Central District of Shiraz County, Fars Province, Iran. At the 2006 census, its population was 230, in 46 families.

References 

Populated places in Shiraz County